Lisa Howard is an American actress and singer. Howard is most known for playing Siobhan in The Twilight Saga: Breaking Dawn – Part 2 and Rona Lisa Peretti in The 25th Annual Putnam County Spelling Bee. Spelling Bee went on to win many awards, including the Drama Desk Award for Best Ensemble. She created the character of Jenny in the new Broadway musical It Shoulda Been You, receiving a 
nomination for the 2015 Drama Desk Award for Outstanding Actress in a Musical.

Early life
Howard was raised in Akron, Ohio, and graduated from Firestone High School. She played softball, soccer, volleyball, and a little basketball in her youth. She went on to graduate from University of Cincinnati – College-Conservatory of Music with a BFA in musical theatre.

TV and film
In 2009, she appeared in the TV series Ugly Betty in the episode Plus None as Dominatrix. In 2012, she was cast as Siobhan, a member of an Irish coven, in The Twilight Saga: Breaking Dawn – Part 2.

Covita
On October 6, 2020, the Lincoln Project released a video called Covita parody of Evita criticizing Donald Trump for failing to protect staff from the COVID-19 pandemic. Lisa Howard sang the vocals for this video.

Stage roles
Howard originated the role of Jenny Steinberg in the Broadway production of David Hyde Pierce-directed It Shoulda Been You. Howard played the older sister of a Jewish bride, played by Sierra Boggess, whose wedding with David Burtka's character is disrupted when her ex-boyfriend shows up at the wedding. Additional cast members included  Tyne Daly and Harriet Harris. For her performance, Howard was nominated for the 2015 Drama Desk Award for Outstanding Actress in a Musical. Playbill Online named her performance of Jenny's Blues at the 2015 Tony Awards one of the show's "greatest moments," and Rolling Stone called it one of the ceremony's best moments.

Broadway
 The 25th Annual Putnam County Spelling Bee (2005) - Rona Lisa Peretti
 South Pacific (2008) - Lt. Genevieve Marshall/Ensemble
 9 to 5 (2009) - Missy/Ensemble
 Priscilla, Queen of the Desert (2011) - Diva/Ensemble (replacement)
 It Shoulda Been You (2015) - Jenny Steinberg  (April 14 – August 9, 2015)
 Escape to Margaritaville (2018) - Tammy

Off-Broadway
 The 25th Annual Putnam County Spelling Bee (2005) - Rona Lisa Peretti
 Silence! The Musical (2005) - Catherine Martin

Regional/National tours
 Cinderella (St. Louis MUNY, 2003) - Stepsister
 The Gift of the Magi (Olney Theatre Center, 2003) - City Her
 The 25th Annual Putnam County Spelling Bee (Barrington Stage Company, 2004) - Rona Janet
 Les Miserables (St. Louis MUNY, 2007) - Madame Thérnadier
 Emmet Otter's Jug-Band Christmas (Goodspeed Opera House, 2008) - Mrs. Gretchen Fox
 9 to 5 (Ahmanson Theatre, 2008) - Missy/Ensemble
 Jim Henson’s Emmet Otter (Goodspeed Opera House, 2009) - Mrs. Gretchen Fox
 Legally Blonde (St. Louis MUNY, 2011) - Paulette
 The Sound of Music (Pittsburgh CLO, 2011)
 It Shoulda Been You (George Street Playhouse, 2011) - Jenny Steinberg
 Wicked (Munchkinland Tour, 2022) - Madame Morrible

References

External links
 Official site
  
 

21st-century American actresses
American musical theatre actresses
University of Cincinnati – College-Conservatory of Music alumni
Living people
Actresses from Akron, Ohio
1975 births